Viśvabandhu Maruḷasiddha, also called Maruḷārādhya or Dāruka, was a Veerashaiva saint and one of the Panchacharyas, the five apostles of Veerashaivism.

It is believed that the Panchacharyas arose out of five great Sthavaralingas located in Balehonnur, Ujjini, Kedar, Srisailam, and Kashi under different names in different Yugas.

Marulasiddha actually arose out of the Siddheśaliṇga of Vaṭakṣetra at Ujjini, where he also founded a maṭha.  He has been conferred the title Viśvabandhu, meaning "the Relative of universe".

Today his followers form one of the influential communities of Karnataka, called Sadhu Lingayats , who form one of the denominations or subcastes of Lingayatism.Most of them are found in and around central Karnataka Davanagere, Ranebennuru, Chitradurga Shimoga.

Tarala balu Samasthana is the main mata for Saadu lingayath located in Sirigere Village, Chitradurga District.  He is believed to be the origin of the Vīraśaiva gotra.

References

Indian Shaivite religious leaders